László Szabó (born 7 February 1989) is a Hungarian professional footballer who plays as a left-back for Nemzeti Bajnokság III club Sopron.

References
HLSZ 
MLSZ

1989 births
Living people
People from Kapuvár
Hungarian footballers
Association football forwards
MTK Budapest FC players
Pécsi MFC players
Ceglédi VSE footballers
Soproni VSE players
Nemzeti Bajnokság I players
Nemzeti Bajnokság II players
Nemzeti Bajnokság III players
Sportspeople from Győr-Moson-Sopron County
21st-century Hungarian people